Daniel Pandèle (born 24 December 1961) is a French former cyclist. He competed in the team pursuit at the 1992 Summer Olympics.

References

External links
 

1961 births
Living people
French male cyclists
Olympic cyclists of France
Cyclists at the 1992 Summer Olympics
Sportspeople from Gironde
French track cyclists
Cyclists from Nouvelle-Aquitaine
21st-century French people
20th-century French people